The Shepherd's Dog is the third full-length studio album by Iron & Wine, released on September 25, 2007. If bought at select retailers or if pre-ordered through Sub Pop, the album comes with a bonus disc featuring two unreleased tracks. "Boy with a Coin" is the first single and was released on July 10, 2007 via Sub Pop, including the single edit of the song along with two other tracks.

The album debuted at number 24 on the U.S. Billboard 200 chart, selling about 32,000 copies in its first week.

In 2008, "Flightless Bird, American Mouth" was used in the movie Twilight.  The song was specifically chosen for the film's prom scene by Kristen Stewart, the female lead, and appears on the movie's soundtrack.

Critical response

On its release The Shepherd's Dog received widespread critical acclaim. At Metacritic, which assigns a normalized rating out of 100 to reviews from mainstream critics, the album received an average score of 84, based on 34 reviews, which indicates "universal acclaim".

The album was ranked at #10 in Paste's list of top albums of 2007. "Pagan Angel and a Borrowed Car" was #86 on Rolling Stones list of the 100 Best Songs of 2007. Pitchfork included the album in their Top 50 Albums of 2007 ranking it at number 36. "Flightless Bird, American Mouth" was a key track used in the 2008 film Twilight, part of the Twilight Saga. The song is closely associated to the successful movie franchise and an acoustic version of the song was also used in The Twilight Saga: Breaking Dawn - Part 1.

Track listing

Personnel
The Shepherd's Dog was performed by:
Sam Beam
Sarah Beam
Jim Becker
Rob Burger
Joey Burns
Brian Deck
EJ Holowicki
John Kattke
Matt Lux
Patrick McKinney
Paul Niehaus

Bonus disc
 "Arms of a Thief" - 3:41
 "Serpent Charmer" - 2:40

Charts

References

External links
Iron and Wine Sics Shepherd's Dog on Fans This Fall
Iron and Wine Reveals Shepherd's Dog Track list

Iron & Wine albums
2007 albums
Sub Pop albums